Ali Jamal Rural District is in the Central District of Boshruyeh County, South Khorasan province, Iran. At the National Census of 2006, its population (as a part of the former Boshruyeh District of Ferdows County) was 3,612 in 1,001 households. There were 2,768 inhabitants in 884 households at the following census of 2011, by which time the district had been separated from the county and Boshruyeh County established. At the most recent census of 2016, the population of the rural district was 2,763 in 955 households. The largest of its 227 villages was Ghaniabad, with 1,353 people.

References 

Boshruyeh County

Rural Districts of South Khorasan Province

Populated places in South Khorasan Province

Populated places in Boshruyeh County